Marja may refer to:

 Marja (name), a Finnish and Dutch female given name
 Marjah, Afghanistan, an unincorporated agricultural district in Nad Ali District, Helmand Province
 Marja', a Shia authority

See also
 Maarja, a given name